The 1990 Houston Cougars football team represented the University of Houston during the 1990 NCAA Division I-A football season. The Cougars were led by first-year head coach John Jenkins and played their home games at the Astrodome in Houston, Texas. The team competed as members of the Southwest Conference, finishing in second. Due to NCAA sanctions, Houston was ineligible to be invited to a bowl game and was banned from being ranked in the Coaches Poll. The Cougars lost only once in the season, to eventual SWC champions Texas, and were ranked 10th in the final AP Poll of the year. Their last regular season game was played in Tokyo, Japan, in the Coca-Cola Classic.

Quarterback David Klingler finished third in voting for the Heisman Trophy, leading the nation with 54 passing touchdowns and 374 completions. His 5,140 passing yards trailed only Heisman-winner Ty Detmer of BYU.

Schedule

Source:

Roster

Rankings

Game summaries

UNLV

at Texas Tech

Rice

at Baylor

Texas A&M

The Cougars drove 95 yards for the game-winning touchdown, a 1-yard run by Chuck Weatherspoon with 20 seconds remaining. Weatherspoon accounted for 218 yards from scrimmage (131 rushing) and 2 touchdowns. David Klingler passed for 352 yards and had 2 touchdowns (1 rushing).

at SMU

Arkansas

TCU

at Texas

Eastern Washington

vs. Arizona State

In the 62–45 victory over the Sun Devils, David Klingler set the Division I-A single-game passing record with 716 yards.

References

Houston
Houston Cougars football seasons
Houston Cougars football